Zahid is a male given name particularly popular in several Asian countries. It has its roots in the Arabic language. In Arabic, there are a few variations based on the exact pronunciation of the name thus having different meanings. One of the meanings of Zahid in Arabic is Altruistic. Zahid is also defined as "the noble man who stops other from wrong doing of 'respectable' belief", explained as: "The Zahid is the literal believer in the letter of the Law, opposed to the Soofi, who believes in its spirit: hence the former is called a Zahiri (outsider), and the latter a Batini, sider."

Notable persons with the name include:

 Zahid Ahmed (actor) (born 1984), Pakistani actor
 Zahid Ahmed (cricketer) (born 1961), Pakistani cricketer
 Zahid Ali (born 1976), Norwegian comedian
 Zahid Iqbal (born 1981), English cricketer
 Zahid Pirzada (born 1958), Pakistani field hockey player
 Zahid Saeed (born 1981), Pakistani cricketer 
 Zahid Shareef (born 1970), Pakistani field hockey player
 Ahmad Zahid Hamidi (born 1953), Malaysian politician
 Zahidullah Salmi (born 2002), Afghan cricketer, also known as Zahid
 Ghayas Zahid (born 1994), Norwegian footballer
 Zahid Mahmood (born 1988), Pakistani cricketer
 Zahid Valencia (born 1997), American freestyle wrestler
 Zahid Hasan (born 1998), Bangladeshi film actor

References

Pakistani masculine given names